Joseph Lafontaine (November 25, 1865 – July 25, 1920) was a farmer and political figure in Quebec. He represented Berthier in the Legislative Assembly of Quebec from 1904 to 1912 and from 1916 to 1919 as a Liberal.

He was born in Saint-Barthélémi, Canada East, the son of Amable Lafontaine and Julie Lincourt, and was educated there, at the Collège de Joliette and the Collège de l'Assomption. Lafontaine was married twice: to Georgie Rochette in 1889 and to Juliette Mousseau in 1905. He was mayor of Saint-Barthélémi from 1897 to 1903 and also served as warden for Berthier County. Lafontaine was president of the school board for Saint-Barthélémi from 1910 to 1919. He was first elected to the Quebec assembly in a 1904 by-election. He was defeated when he ran for reelection in 1912 but elected again in 1916. In 1919, he was named inspector of prisons. Lafontaine died in Saint-Barthélémi at the age of 54.

References
 

1865 births
1920 deaths
Quebec Liberal Party MNAs
Mayors of places in Quebec